Beriotisia cuculliformis is a moth of the family Noctuidae. It is found in the Magallanes Region of Chile and the Chubut Province of Argentina.

The wingspan is 27–37 mm. Adults are on wing in October and February.

External links
 Noctuinae of Chile

Noctuinae